Peter James Lorimer (16 April 1939 – 7 February 2010) was a New Zealand mathematician. His research concerned group theory, combinatorics, and Ramsey theory.

Academic career
Born in Christchurch, Lorimer did a  BSc / MSc in mathematics at the University of Auckland  and won a Commonwealth Scholarship to do a PhD at McGill University in Montreal, which he completed in 1963 under the supervision of Hans Schwerdtfeger. He returned to New Zealand to lecture, first at University of Canterbury and then at University of Auckland.

References

External links
 institutional homepage

1939 births
2010 deaths
Group theorists
Combinatorialists
University of Auckland alumni
Academic staff of the University of Auckland
People from Christchurch
McGill University alumni
Academic staff of the University of Canterbury
New Zealand mathematicians
Fellows of the Royal Society of New Zealand